Li Xuebo (born 15 November 1999) is a Chinese footballer who plays as a goalkeeper for Zibo Cuju, on loan from Dalian Pro.

Club career
Li played for Spanish club Atlético Madrid between 2012 and 2019, as part of a Wanda Group initiative to encourage young Chinese footballers to play in Spain. Li Xuebo would return to China with Dalian Pro where he would be promoted to their senior team and go on to make his debut in a league game against Tianjin TEDA on 31 October 2020, in a 2-1 victory.

Career statistics
.

References

External links

1999 births
Living people
Chinese footballers
China youth international footballers
Chinese expatriate footballers
Association football goalkeepers
Atlético Madrid footballers
Dalian Professional F.C. players
Chinese expatriate sportspeople in Spain
Expatriate footballers in Spain